Javan was a descendant of Noah, according to the Hebrew Bible.

Javan may also refer to:

 Something of, from, or related to the Indonesian island of Java

Characters 
 Javan (ThunderCats), a character in the animated series ThunderCats

People with the given name 
 Javan Sebastian (born 1994), Welsh rugby union player
 Javan Vidal (born 1989), English footballer

People with the surname 
 Ali Javan (1926–2016), Iranian-American physicist
 Rambod Javan (born 1971), Iranian actor

See also  
 
 
 Java (disambiguation)
 Javanese (disambiguation)
 Javon (disambiguation)
 Jawan (disambiguation)
 Yawan (disambiguation)